Maindhan may refer to:
 Maindhan (1994 film), an Indian Tamil-language drama film
 Maindhan (2014 film), a Tamil-language Malaysian action comedy film